The Izvor is a left tributary of the river Mureș in Romania. It discharges into the Mureș in Birchiș.

References

Rivers of Romania
Rivers of Arad County